Combined Operations Headquarters was a department of the British War Office set up during Second World War to harass the Germans on the European continent by means of raids carried out by use of combined naval and army forces.

History
The command used air and naval units to deliver the Commandos to various targets, and then recover them. Thus, it was a combined arms coordination and command structure. Admiral of the Fleet Roger Keyes was the first director, from 17 July 1940 to 27 October 1941. He was replaced first by Lord Louis Mountbatten, who led the command for a year. He in turn was succeeded by Major General Robert Laycock (October 1943 – 1947). 

It comprised background staff whose job was to plan operations and to develop ideas and equipment to harass the enemy in any way possible. It also covered all those who worked with landing craft up to and including the landing ships that were used in the various amphibious operations.

The badge of Combined Operations was an Albatross over a submachine gun over an anchor, reflecting the three service arms; the Royal Air Force, the British Army and the Royal Navy. In 1941 the title of Director of Combined Operations was changed to Adviser Combined Operations. In 1942 the title of Adviser Combined Operations was changed to Chief of Combined Operations.

The department existed until 1947 but later re-emerged under a new name in 1951 the Amphibious Warfare Headquarters.

Directors of Combined Operations
 Admiral of the Fleet Roger Keyes (17 July 1940 to 27 October 1941).

Adviser Combined Operations
 Commodore, Lord Louis Mountbatten (28 October 1941–1942).

Chiefs of Combined Operations
 Commodore, Lord Louis Mountbatten (1942-September 1943).
 Major General Robert Laycock (October 1943 – 1947).

Operations

Operations included:

 Operation Collar (24–25 June 1940) – the first British Commando raid on occupied Europe.
 Operation Frankton (the "Cockleshell heroes") – attack by canoe on shipping in France.
 Operation Claymore (4 March 1941) – the raid on the Lofoten Islands to destroy fish oil factories and stocks.
Operation Archery (27 December 1941) a raid on German positions on the island of Vågsøy
 Operation Jubilee (19 August 1942) – the Dieppe raid.
 Operation Chariot – the St. Nazaire raid.
 Mulberry harbours – portable harbours for D-Day.
 Project Habakkuk – the development and construction of giant ice ships.
 Operation Gambit – the use of X-class submarines to provide navigational aid at Sword and Juno Beaches.
 Exercise Tiger – D-Day training with tragic results.
 Operation Biting – captured a Würzburg radar.
 Operation Starkey – a staged invasion of Europe in 1943.
 Operation Pluto – construction of petroleum pipelines underneath the English Channel.
 Operation Freshman – Attack on the Vemork Norsk Hydro chemical plant in Telemark.

Units
Combined Operations Pilotage Parties (COPP) – a unit that surveyed landing sites for invasions, including those of Sicily and Normandy. The unit was made up of members of the Royal Navy, Royal Marines, Corps of Royal Engineers and Special Boat Service.
Small Scale Raiding Force, also known as "No. 62 Commando".
 See also Captain Logan Scott-Bowden

Film
The Attack on the Iron Coast (film) depicts an account of Allied Combined Operations Headquarters commandos executing a daring raid on the German-occupied French coast during the Second World War.

References

Sources

External links

 Combined Operations Command website

Military history of the United Kingdom during World War II
Joint military units and formations of the United Kingdom
Military headquarters in the United Kingdom